The 1990 Copa del Rey Final was the 88th final of the King's Cup. The final was played at Mestalla Stadium in Valencia on 5 April 1990, and was won by Barcelona, who beat Real Madrid 2–0.

Details

See also
El Clásico

References

1990
1989–90 in Spanish football
FC Barcelona matches
Real Madrid CF matches
El Clásico matches